Albert Paul Shenar (February 12, 1936 − October 11, 1989) was an American actor and theater director, known for portraying the Bolivian drug lord Alejandro Sosa in Scarface (1983).

A veteran Broadway and Shakespearean actor, he was one of the twenty-seven founding members of the American Conservatory Theater.

Early life
Shenar was born in Milwaukee, Wisconsin, the second of four boys (one older brother John, two younger brothers Michael and Marc), born from Mary Rosella (née Puhek) and Eugene Joseph Shenar. He was of Polish and Slovenian descent.

Career
Shenar became involved in theater at an early age, working in Milwaukee playhouse productions. After graduating from high school, he enlisted in the United States Air Force. Following his military career he began acting again. Shenar gained attention playing larger-than-life entertainment legends in 1970s television films—Orson Welles in The Night That Panicked America and Florenz Ziegfeld, Jr., in Ziegfeld: The Man and His Women. He portrayed the character John Carrington in Part II of the miniseries Roots.

In 1983, Shenar also portrayed Alejandro Sosa in Brian De Palma's Scarface and later portrayed Paulo Rocca in Raw Deal.

A founding member, actor, director and teacher of the American Conservatory Theater (ACT) in San Francisco, he played more than forty roles there, including Hamlet, Oedipus Rex and Brother Julian in Tiny Alice. In 1982, He portrayed Jenner in Don Bluth's The Secret of NIMH; his performance in the film impressed Bluth so much that he wanted Shenar to also portray Borf in Space Ace, but was unable to do so due to budget issues and the role ultimately went to Bluth himself.

Shenar continued to act during the late 1980s. He did a stage version of Macbeth in Los Angeles and appeared in films like Best Seller (1987), The Bedroom Window (1987), The Big Blue (1988), plus the TV film Rage of Angels: The Story Continues.

Personal life
Shenar was gay, and was romantically involved with the British actor Jeremy Brett during the 1970s; they were in a relationship that reportedly lasted from 1973 to 1978. After the couple separated, they remained close friends until Shenar's death in 1989.

Death
Shenar died from AIDS on October 11, 1989.

Filmography

Film

Television

References

External links

1936 births
1989 deaths
20th-century American male actors
20th-century American LGBT people
Male actors from Milwaukee
AIDS-related deaths in California
American male film actors
American male television actors
American people of Polish descent
American people of Slovenian descent
United States Air Force airmen
American gay actors
LGBT people from Wisconsin